Eomeropidae is a family of aberrant, flattened scorpionflies represented today by only a single living species, Notiothauma reedi, known from the Nothofagus forests in southern Chile, while all other recognized genera in the family are known only as fossils, with the earliest definitive fossil known from Liassic-aged strata, and the youngest from Paleogene-aged strata.

Genera
There are six extinct genera and one monotypic living genus which have been placed in Eomeropidae.   
 †Eomerope. Cockerell 1909 This genus is known from Paleogene fossils from Eocene and Oligocene strata of North America, including the Allenby Formation and the Florissant Formation, and Paleocene to Oligocene strata of Russia.  Because N. reedi is not known in the fossil record, Eomerope is the youngest of the fossil genera, and has the widest range.
†Burmothauma Zhang at al. 2022 B. eureka is known from the mid Cretaceous Burmese amber of Myanmar.
 †Jurachorista.  Soszyńska-Maj, et al., 2016 Known from the Early Jurassic, Sinemurian aged Charmouth Mudstone Formation of Dorset, England, is currently considered to be the oldest definitive member of the family.
 †Jurathauma. Zhang et al. 2011 J. simplex is one of three species of eomeropid scorpionflies from the Middle Jurassic Daohugou Beds of China.  Its wing veins are distinct from all other eomeropids.
 Notiothauma. McLachlan, 1877 N. reedi is a remarkable species, flattened and extremely cockroach-like in appearance and habits. It is nocturnal, and scuttles on the forest floor, where it can be collected by laying trails of oatmeal.  The larvae are still unknown.  Because this is the last extant species of Eomeropidae, N. reedi can be characterized as a living fossil taxon.
 †Tsuchingothauma. Ren and Shih 2005 T. shihi and T. gongi  are both known from the Middle Jurassic Daohugou beds of China.
 †Typhothauma Ren and Shih 2005 known from the Early Cretaceous Dabeigou Formation and Yixian Formation of China.

Phylogeny 
The proposed phylogenetic relationships within Eomeropidae based on Soszyńska-Maj et al 2016.

References

Mecoptera
Insect families
Extant Triassic first appearances